The Slovenia national junior handball team is the national under-20 handball team of Slovenia. Controlled by the Slovenian Handball Federation, that is an affiliate of the International Handball Federation IHF as well as a member of the European Handball Federation EHF, The team represents Slovenia in international matches.

Statistics

IHF Junior World Championship record
 Champions   Runners up   Third place   Fourth place

EHF European Junior Championship 
 Champions   Runners up   Third place   Fourth place

References

External links
World Men's Youth Championship table
European Men's Youth Championship table

Handball in Slovenia
Men's national junior handball teams
Handball